Wilkie Sugar Loaf is a Canadian peak in the Cape Breton Highlands near the community of Sugar Loaf in the province of Nova Scotia.

Description

There are few stand-alone mountaintops in Nova Scotia, but one of these is Wilkie Sugar Loaf, climbing to more than 400 metres/yards above sea level in less than 1.5 kilometers (0.9 mi). This peak belongs to the North Mountain range of hills bordering the Aspy Fault, but has been separated from the rest of the ridge by the deep ravines cut by Wilkie Brook and Polly Brook.

The name
Wilkie Sugar Loaf has been the official name for this mountain since April 21, 1936.  The mountain's name is a combination of both "Wilkie," the family name of a pioneer family in who settled in the area in 1820, James Wilkie Jr. was an original land grant recipient in the area in 1852, and "Sugar Loaf", a descriptive name for the mountain's distinct pyramidal shape, which suggests a "sugarloaf".  The name Wilkie Sugar Loaf was already in common use in official publications such as Admiralty Charts and Sailing Directions by 1860.  The Mi'kmaq name for the mountain was "Squa-dichk," meaning "the highest point."

Triangulation station
A Natural Resources Canada Geodetic Survey Division Station, Unique Number (Station Number): 23107, Station Name "SUGAR LOAF 19659", is located near the summit, consisting of a copper bolt sunk about 1 inch in a standard concrete monument. While the station can still be found, there are no remains of the tower.

The trail
Access to the summit is possible by hiking the Wilkie Sugar Loaf trail which leads from a trailhead on the west side of the Bay St Lawrence Road, 1.15 kilometres (0.71 mi) north of the entrance of Cabots Landing Provincial Park, to the peak of the mountain, offering views from two mountain top look-offs.  One look-off faces toward the Aspy Fault plateau and Aspy Fault including the plateau of the national park in the distance to the south-west as well as the beach at Cabots Landing, Aspy Harbour and the villages of Cape North and Dingwall to the south and east.  The second look-off presents a view of the hills to the north and to Bay St. Lawrence and the Gulf of St. Lawrence beyond. On a very clear day it is possible to see all the way to Newfoundland.

References

External links

Nova Scotia Geographical Names Database entry for "Wilkie Sugar Loaf, County of Victoria" (includes map)
Wilkie Sugarloaf on TrailPeak.com (with map and photos)
Wilkie Sugarloaf on Geocaching.com

Mountains of Nova Scotia
Landforms of Victoria County, Nova Scotia
Mountains of Canada under 1000 metres